Beware of Pickpockets is a 1981 Hong Kong comedy film directed by Wu Ma and starring Dean Shek, Karl Maka and Wu.

Plot
Righteous officer Big Nose Pau is ordered to arrest pickpocket Extra Hand. However, each time he was caught, he was released due to a lack of evidence. Although Extra Hand is a tricky man, he is actually a Robin Hood like pickpocket who steals dirty money from the rich to raise seven orphaned children that he adopted. Extra Hand plans to save money to build an orphanage for the children to live in.

Later, Extra Hand learns that his rival, Dog Lice, has robbed many jewels and therefore, Extra Hand planned to steal them from him.

After a major battle with Dog Lice and his gang, Extra Hand was caught by Pau. Although Pau was hesitant to arrest him, Extra Hand decides not to give a tough job for Big Nose and surrenders to him. However, seeing how Extra Hands is doing all this for the orphans, Pau decides to let him go.

Cast
Dean Shek as Extra Hand
Karl Maka as Big Nose
Wu Ma as Superintendent
Annie Liu as Pau's sister
Hon Kwok-choi as Dog Lice
Cheung Ka-ho as Orphaned child
Cheung Ying-wai as Orphaned child
Cheng Ka-kai as Orphaned child
Ha Wai-hong as Orphaned child
Lok Wai-ming as Orphaned child
Hui Yiu-wai as Orphaned child 
Kwok Po-keung as Orphaned child
Tang Ching as Judge Koo Ming-lim
Chic Lau as Superintendent's wife
Wong Au-ngai as Lice's wife
Tai San as Lice's gang member
Ka Lee as Lice's gang member
Pang Yun-cheung as Lice's gang member
Ng Hon-keung as Lice's gang member
Ho Pak-kwong as Mercy Tai
Sze Kai-keung as House owner
Che Hung as Medicine buyer
Sai Gwa-Pau
Lai Lok-ling
Leung Hung
Lau Chuen as Court clerk
Raymond Wong as Dishonest Diner (cameo)
Cheung Sek-au as House sub-letter

Theme song
Beware of Pickpockets (提防小手)
Composer: Joseph Koo
Lyricist: Raymond Wong, Cheng Kwok-kong
Singer: Dean Shek, Wah Wah Children Choir

Box office
The film grossed HK$5,109,130 at the Hong Kong box office during its theatrical run from 5 to 18 February 1981 in Hong Kong.

References

External links

Beware of Pickpockets at Hong Kong Cinemagic

1981 films
1981 comedy films
Hong Kong slapstick comedy films
1980s Cantonese-language films
Films directed by Wu Ma
Films shot in Hong Kong
1980s Hong Kong films